Massanutten, Virginia is a census-designated place in Rockingham County. Massanutten may also refer to:

Massanutten Academy, a military academy for grades 7–12
Massanutton Heights, a historic home located near Luray, Page County, Virginia
Massanutten Mountain, a mountain of the Ridge-and-Valley Appalachians
Massanutten Trail, a National Recreation Trail in George Washington National Forest
AA Massanutten District, a defunct high school athletics conference